Incorrigible Liar is a 1973 Soviet comedy film directed by Villen Azarov.

Plot
Alexei Ivanovich Tyutyurin (Georgy Vitsin) is a very kind and gentle person who has been working as a hairdresser for twenty years. When there is an opportunity to be promoted to the salon's manager, he faces a problem - in the collective he has a reputation for being constantly late and being an incorrigible liar. According to his boss, Vasily Vasilievich Mymrikov (Nikolai Prokopovich), Tyutyurin has two drawbacks: "First, he lies, and secondly, he does not know how to lie," which is why he refuses to sign his recommendation letter.

But in fact Alexei does not deceive anyone - he actually does get into unusual situations on the way to work: he helps a boy to pick up his ball off the roadway, after which he is doused in water by an auto-dispenser, and Tyutyurin has to return home to change clothes; then returns a lost gold cigarette case to a foreign prince, in gratitude for which he arranges dinner in honor of Tyutyurin; then falls under a car, behind the wheel of which sits Edita Piekha ...

After yet another delay Tyutyurin really does begin to compose a fable. He, with the help of Mymrikov, tells a "believable" story about a party with beauties and dances. The chief remains satisfied with Alexei's "corrected behavior" and decides to sign the character reference letter. But, tormented by remorse, Tyutyurin very quickly confesses that he lied, telling the true story about a girl, a ball and a fountain. Vasily Vasilyevich immediately becomes sure that Alexei is incorrigible and decides to take the most drastic measures. At this time, the prince's translator comes to the beauty salon with a gift for Tyutyurin, and a little later - Edita Piekha and with Alexei's wife, and all misunderstandings are resolved.

Cast
Georgy Vitsin - Alexei Ivanovich Tyutyurin
Inna Makarova - Zinaida Nikolaevna Tyutyurina
Nikolai Prokopovich - Vasily Vasilievich Mymrikov
Vladimir Etush - Prince of Burukhtania Emir Burokhtan Second Second
Edita Piekha - cameo
Emmanuel Geller - Rakhtan, the chief servant of the Prince of Burukhtania
Boris Sichkin - translator
Nikolai Pogodin - policeman at the embassy
Nikolay Parfyonov - man in the park who offers to help out for the cigarette case
Ivan Ryzhov - Senior Master
Larisa Barabanova - Hairdresser Katya
Valentina Berezutskaya
Julia Tsoglin - hairdresser
Valentina Khmara - hairdresser
Larisa Vadko - Tyuturin's dance partner
Galina Mikeladze
Alexandra Dorokhina - Misha's mother
Radner Muratov - waterer

References

External links

Soviet comedy films
Mosfilm films
1973 comedy films
1973 films